John Lee Farris (born July 26, 1936) is an American novelist, screenwriter, and playwright (with occasional short stories and poetry) who first achieved best-seller status at age twenty-three and is most famous as the author of The Fury (Playboy Press, 1976). He is also known largely for his work in the southern Gothic genre.

Life
Farris was born in Jefferson City, Missouri, to parents John Linder Farris (1909–1982) and Eleanor Carter Farris (1905–1984). Raised in Tennessee, he graduated from Central High School in Memphis and attended Southwestern College (now Rhodes College), also in Memphis. His first wife, Kathleen,(deceased) was the mother of Julie Marie, John and Jeff Farris; his second wife, Mary Ann Pasante, is the mother of Peter John (P.J.) Farris.

Beginning with his first publication at age 19, The Corpse Next door, From the mid-1950s through the 1960s, Farris published twelve novels, including a series of hardboiled crime novels under the pseudonym 'Steve Brackeen.' Farris's early "Harrison High" novels were a major influence on Stephen King.  Farris had assisted in the rejuvenation of the horror novel with When Michael Calls, published in 1967.  

Apart from his substantial body of fiction, his work includes motion picture screenplays of his own books (i.e., The Fury), original scripts and adaptations of the works of others (such as Alfred Bester's The Demolished Man). He also wrote and directed the film Dear Dead Delilah in 1973. He has had several plays produced off-Broadway, and also paints and writes poetry. At various times he has made his home in New York, southern California, Puerto Rico, and most recently near Atlanta, Georgia.

Film adaptations
Three of his works have been made into film: first Harrison High became Because They're Young (1960), followed by When Michael Calls (1972), and then The Fury (1978) which was directed by Brian De Palma.

TV adaptations
Farris's short story "I Scream. You Scream. We All Scream for Ice Cream." was adapted for the Showtime anthology series Masters of Horror in 2007.

Bibliography

Novels (and other fiction)
The Corpse Next Door (Graphic Books, 1956) (as John Farris)
The Body on the Beach (Bouregy & Curl, 1957, hc) (as Steve Brackeen)
Baby Moll (Crest, 1958, pb)  (as Steve Brackeen)
Danger in My Blood (Crest, 1958, pb)  (as Steve Brackeen)
Harrison High (Rinehart & Co., 1959) (as John Farris)
Delfina (Gold Medal, 1962, pb)  (as Steve Brackeen)
The Long Light of Dawn (Putnam, 1962) (as John Farris)
The Guardians (Holt, Rinehart & Winston, 1964, hc) (as Steve Brackeen)
King Windom (Trident, 1967) (as John Farris from here on)
When Michael Calls (Trident, 1967)
The Girl from Harrison High (Pocket Books, 1968, pb)
The Captors (Trident, 1969)
A Sudden Stillness (1970)
The Trouble at Harrison High (Pocket Books, 1970, pb)
Shadow on Harrison High (Pocket Books, 1972, pb)
Happy Anniversary, Harrison High (Pocket Books, 1973, pb)
Crisis at Harrison High (Pocket Books, 1974, pb)
Sharp Practice (Simon & Schuster, 1974)
The Fury (Playboy Press, 1976)
Bad Blood (1977)
All Heads Turn When the Hunt Goes By  (Playboy Press, 1977; published in the UK as Bad Blood)
Shatter (W. H. Allen [UK] 1980) (true first)
Catacombs (Delacorte, 1981)
The Uninvited (Delacorte, 1982)
Son of the Endless Night (1984)
Minotaur (Tor, 1985, pb)
Wildwood (Tor, 1986, pb)
Nightfall (Tor, 1987, pb)
Scare Tactics (1988)
The Axeman Cometh (Tor, 1989, pb)
Fiends (Dark Harvest, 1990 [limited edition])
Demonios (1991)
Sacrifice (Tor, 1994)
Dragonfly (Tor/Forge, 1995)
Soon She Will Be Gone (Tor/Forge, 1997)
Solar Eclipse (Forge, 1999)
The Fury and the Terror (2001)
The Fury and the Power (2003)
Phantom Nights''' (2004)Elvisland (Babbage Press, 2004) (Short stories)Avenging Fury (2008)You Don't Scare Me (2007)High Bloods (2009)

Short storiesI Scream. You Scream. We All Scream for Ice Cream.Story Time with the Bluefield StranglerTransgressions: Volume TwoScreenplaysDear Dead Delilah (1972)The Fury (1978)

Further reading
 David J. Schow. "John [Lee] Farris" in S.T. Joshi and Stefan Dziemianowicz (eds). Supernatural Literature of the World (Westport CT: Greenwood Press, 2005) pp. 403-404.
 Douglas Winter. 'Writers of Today" in Jack Sullivan, ed. The Penguin Encyclopedia of Horror and the Supernatural'' (NY: Viking Penguin, 1986) p. 468

References 

John William Warren and Adrian W. McClaren. Tennessee Belles-Lettres: A Guide to Tennessee Literature. Morristown, Tennessee: Morrison Print Co., 1977.

External links
 Furies & Fiends Official website

1936 births
Rhodes College alumni
American horror writers
Living people
20th-century American novelists
American male screenwriters
People from Jefferson City, Missouri
Novelists from Missouri
Novelists from Tennessee
American male novelists
PEN Oakland/Josephine Miles Literary Award winners
20th-century American male writers
Screenwriters from Missouri
Screenwriters from Tennessee